Sven August Malm (25 February 1894 – 26 November 1974) was a Swedish sprinter who competed at the 1920 Summer Olympics. He won a bronze medal in the 4 × 100 m and finished fifth in the 4 × 400 m relay, but failed to reach the finals of individual 100 m and 200 m events.

Malm won the 1917 Swedish title in the 400 m hurdles, but did not compete in this event at the Olympics. Between 1916 and 1923 he was either a winner or runner up at every Swedish 4 × 100 m relay championship.

References

1894 births
1974 deaths
Athletes from Stockholm
Swedish male sprinters
Olympic bronze medalists for Sweden
Athletes (track and field) at the 1920 Summer Olympics
Olympic athletes of Sweden
Medalists at the 1920 Summer Olympics
Olympic bronze medalists in athletics (track and field)
20th-century Swedish people